Lorenzo Musto (born 22 January 1996) is an Italian football player. He plays in Serie D club .

Club career
He made his Serie C debut for Gubbio on 27 August 2016 in a game against Pordenone. On 31 January 2018, he joins Arzachena on loan.

In June 2019, Musto joined Serie D c Marra e Musto, che attacco per l’Arconatese, sportlegnano.it, 29 June 2019</ref>

References

External links
 

1996 births
Footballers from Rome
Living people
Italian footballers
Association football forwards
Serie D players
Serie C players
A.S. Gubbio 1910 players
F.C. Lumezzane V.G.Z. A.S.D. players
A.C. Renate players
FC Chiasso players
Italian expatriate footballers
Italian expatriate sportspeople in Switzerland
Expatriate footballers in Switzerland